The 2018–19 WNBL season is the 39th season of the competition since its establishment in 1981. The Townsville Fire were the defending champions, however they failed to qualify for the finals. Canberra Capitals won their record eighth championship, defeating Adelaide in the grand final series, 2–1.

Chemist Warehouse was announced as the WNBL's naming rights partner for this season, after signing a three-year deal in July 2018. Spalding again provided equipment including the official game ball, alongside iAthletic supplying team apparel for a second year.

Player movement

Standings

Finals

Statistics

Individual statistic leaders

Individual game highs

Awards

Player of the Week

Team of the Week

Player & Coach of the Month Awards

Postseason Awards

Team captains and coaches

References

External links 
 WNBL official website

 
2018–19 in Australian basketball
Australia
Basketball
Basketball